My Best Friend's Wedding is a 1997 American film.

My Best Friend's Wedding may also refer to:

 My Best Friend's Wedding (2016 film), a Chinese remake of the 1997 film
 My Best Friend's Wedding (musical), an upcoming stage adaptation of the 1997 film

Television episodes
 "My Best Friend's Wedding" (The Drew Carey Show)
 "My Best Friend's Wedding" (Felicity)
 "My Best Friend's Wedding" (Grosse Pointe)
 "My Best Friend's Wedding" (Jesse)
 "My Best Friend's Wedding" (Scrubs)

See also
 "My Best Friend's Weddings", a 2020 song by the Chicks from Gaslighter
 Mere Yaar Ki Shaadi Hai (lit. It's My Friend's Wedding), a 2002 Indian Hindi-language film partly adapted from the 1997 film